Ethmia elutella is a moth in the family Depressariidae. It is found from Panama to Venezuela and Trinidad. There is also a record from Chile.

The ground color of the forewings is white, mostly obscured by grayish clouding or ill-defined blotches basally and through the costal half except along the costa on the distal one-third. The ground color of the hindwings is pale gray except under the costal hair pencil, where it is pale ocherous. Adults are on wing in February, March and May.

References

Moths described in 1914
elutella